Readers' advisory (sometimes spelled readers advisory or reader's advisory) is a service which involves suggesting fiction and nonfiction titles to a reader through direct or indirect means.  This service is a fundamental library service; however, readers' advisory also occurs in commercial contexts such as bookstores.  Currently, almost all North American public libraries offer some form of readers' advisory.

History

North America
"Setting a date for the start of what we now call readers advisory service, particularly readers advisory in the public library, is at best a frustrating, almost arbitrary exercise. Efforts at historical precision can founder on such basic issues as the absence of common definitions. For example, answers to such questions as 'What exactly is a public library?" or "What really is readers advisory?" have long been disputed." (Bill Crowley, from his 2005 journal article "Rediscovering the History of Readers Advisory Service")

Opposing Viewpoints on the Merits of Different Types of Readers' Advisory

The historical period divisions and merits of different types of readers' advisory services is a hotly debated topic among librarians.

Bill Crowley, in his 2005 article, "Rediscovering the History of Readers Advisory Service," breaks down the historical period divisions of the service into four eras:
 1876 to 1920 – "Inventing" Readers' Advisory
 1920 to 1940 – "Privileging Nonfiction" in Readers' Advisory
 1940 to 1984 – Readers' Advisory "'Lost' in Adult Services"
 1984 to 2005 (current at time of article) – "Reviving Readers' Advisory"

Juris Dilevko and Candice Magowan question the merits of the current readers' advisory emphasis on popular fiction materials in their book "Readers' Advisory Service in North American Public Libraries, 1870–2005."  They subdivide the history as:
 1870 to 1916 – "The Formative Years"
 1917 to 1962 – "The Commitment to Systematic Adult Education"
 1963 to 2005 – "The Devolution into Entertainment"

Dilevko and Mogowan write about "readers' advisory systematically committ[ing] itself to meaningful adult education through serious and purposeful reading" up until the 1960s, when emphasis on "popular culture resulted in the 'Give 'Em What They Want' approach" and "The Devolution into Entertainment."

1897–1920

In 1897, the ALA President stated that "the personal influence of librarians who assisted and advised readers was the most potent force in molding community reading."

1920–1980

Organized readers' advisory programs have been documented dating back to the 1920s.  Between 1922–1926 readers' advisory programs were experimentally introduced into seven urban libraries (Cleveland and Detroit, in 1922, Indianapolis, Milwaukee, and Chicago, in 1923 and 1924, and Cincinnati and Portland, OR).

The Adult Education Movement emerged in the 1920s in public libraries and was frequently discussed in American Library Association professional publications.

The 1924 report The American Public Library and the Diffusion of Knowledge by William Learned to the Carnegie Corporation sought to establish adult education as the focus of the public library, with personalized readers' advisory service to adult readers by "reference experts" who would make up a "community intelligence service."

The 1926 American Library Association "book-length" commission report Libraries and Adult Education placed high importance on readers' advisory services in Adult Education.  Judson T. Jennings provided a summary of the work, observing that the "library's contribution to adult education resolved itself into three major activities:"

1. An information service regarding local opportunities for adult students.
2. Service to other agencies engaged in adult education.
3. Service to individual readers and students.

This new professional interest during the 1920s spurred the creation of specialized full-time readers' advisory positions in major public libraries. By 1936, an estiminated, 50 public libraries had established readers' advisory services.

Until the early 1960s, readers' advisory focused on non-fiction materials and continuing adult education.

1980s – 2000s

Some librarians consider the early 1980s to be the beginning of a revival in readers' advisory and praise the inclusion of fiction (including genre fiction: fantasy, mystery, romance, etc.) and write that historically
readers' advisory was biased in favor of nonfiction.

Others disapprove of the new approaches and changes in service.  Dilevko and Magowan write "Post-1980 readers' advisory thus became an opportunity to converse with patrons about 'light, quick, escapist' books -- popular and ephemeral fiction and nonfiction for entertainment, pleasure, and recreation -- because such conversations were not 'too burdensome'."

In 1982, the term "genreflecting" was first coined by Betty Rosenberg, who authored: Genreflecting: A Guide to Reading Interests in Genre Fiction (Libraries Unlimited, 1982).

Another major influence on the spread and revival of readers' advisory was the Adult Reading Round Table (ARRT), founded by a group of Chicago public librarians in 1984.  The group organized workshops, seminars, and genre-study groups.

Current Interest
Interest in readers' advisory continues to grow. Libraries Unlimited Genreflecting Advisory Series has grown to 27 titles as of July 2008 (from 15 titles in 2005).  Beyond traditional genres (fantasy, mystery, romance), some of the diverse offerings now include guides to LGBT literature, guides to graphic novels (comic books, manga, etc), and Christian fiction.

". . . contemporary readers advisory service is best understood as an organized program promoting both fiction and nonfiction discretionary reading for the dual purposes of satisfying reader needs and advancing a culture's goal of a literate population." (Bill Crowley, from his 2005 journal article "Rediscovering the History of Readers Advisory Service")

Types

Direct readers' advisory
Direct readers' advisory is based on a non-judgmental assessment of the personal preferences of the reader through a series of questions, called a readers advisory conversation.  The assessment focuses on reader likes and dislikes with regard to a number of factors, including subject, reading level, genre, writing style, the level of characterization, plot elements, storyline, pace, tone, frame, and setting.  The hoped-for outcome of this interview is the identification of three or more appropriate suggestions (sometimes referred to as "readalikes"—especially when the interview was initiated by patron interest in new authors/titles similar to one enjoyed in the past).  In identifying suitable suggestions, a readers' advisor combines personal knowledge of material with a variety of specialized print and online resources to come up with appropriate suggestions. The goal of direct readers advisory is to suggest titles based on a reader's individual interests and tastes.  Librarians who simply recommend their favorite books with little or no regard for the patron's own interests are not performing readers' advisory.

For example, if a patron requests "a good book," the readers' advisor might ask the reader to describe a book they have enjoyed.  The focus of the conversation is not on recitation of plot, but on the aforementioned appeal elements (i.e. pace, subject, tone, writing style, etc.).  In our example, the patron tells the readers' advisor of a humorous mystery novel with a sharp-tongued female protagonist.  Our readers' advisor also learns that the patron prefers fast-paced dialogue to excessive descriptive passages.  Once the appeal elements have been identified (i.e. a humorous mystery featuring snappy dialogue and a female protagonist), the readers' advisor will suggest appropriate titles in the collection by drawing on personal knowledge and/or by consulting appropriate print and online resources.  Even though the patron requested a mystery, a skilled readers advisor will often offer a suggestion or two that point the reader to new a new vista outside of a mentioned genre or milieu.

Readers' advisory can also be performed across multiple media.  For example, a patron who likes the movie Matilda might be unaware that it is based on a book by Roald Dahl.  Other patrons who enjoy audio books may be introduced to other titles read by the same person.

Questions to consider asking in the readers' advisory interview

In the 2005 edition of Readers' Advisory Services in the Public Library, Joyce Saricks lists some questions for advisors to consider, such as:
 Are characters and plot quickly revealed or slowly unveiled? (Identifying Pacing)
 Is there more dialogue or more description? (Identifying Pacing)
 Is there a focus on a single character or on several whose lives are intertwined (Identify Characterization)
 Is the focus of the story more interior and psychological or exterior and action oriented? (Identifying Story Line)

Indirect readers' advisory

Indirect readers' advisory involves the creation of displays, bookmarks, and annotated book lists that a reader/patron can pick up and peruse on their own without actively engaging a readers' advisor.  Indirect readers' advisory aids, particularly annotated book lists, focus on appeal elements rather than providing extensive plot summaries.  Recently, some public libraries (like the Williamsburg Regional Library in Virginia) have begun experimenting with form-based readers' advisory, which allows for a richer indirect readers advisory experience.

Maintaining a Staff Recommendations display is another way to improve a library's readers' advisory service. Since many readers are browsers, staff recommendations make it easier to select a book.

In their 2001 article "Reader's Advisory: Matching Mood and Material," Ross and Chelton recommend placing books in four areas of the library in order to make the most of merchandising. These four areas are the entrance, the ends of stacks, high traffic areas, and the circulation desk. Placing the display in these areas ensure that patrons will see and, hopefully, utilize the books on display. Ross and Chelton also note that books, not posters and announcements, should be here because merchandised titles will circulate very quickly.

Discussion of Readers' Advisory Resources

There are numerous books, online subscription databases, and websites dedicated to readers' advisory.

Australia and New Zealand
 Libraries Alive provide a guide to readers' advisory resources for Australian and New Zealand readers and authors.
 Better Reading is a website that aims to be a great source of independent book recommendations for Australian readers and their families. The site focusses on sharing great stories, and helping people discover new books and authors.

Print Resources

Popular print resources include the What Do I Read Next? series of reference books (published by Thomson Gale), the Genreflecting series (published by Libraries Unlimited), and the Readers' Advisory Guides (published by the American Library Association).
Seattle Librarian Nancy Pearl achieved broad fame and recognition for her readers guides, Book Lust and More Book Lust, which recommend "reading for every mood, moment, and reason."  Both have been popular with the general public and can be found at most book stores and libraries.  Also of note are Pearl's guides to contemporary fiction: Now Read This: A Guide to Mainstream Fiction, 1978–1998 and Now Read This II: A Guide to Mainstream Fiction, 1990–2001.

BookPage is a periodical available at many public libraries, containing book reviews, recommended reading lists, and author interviews.

Internet Resources
 Fiction_L was the Morton Grove Public Library's electronic mailing list for readers' advisory discussions, developed by Roberta S. Johnson and the Reader's Services staff of the library. As of June 2016, Fiction_L is managed by Cuyahoga County Public Library. Visit the new Fiction_L web page. The List encompasses fiction, as well as "all aspects of reader's advisory for children, young adults and adults, including non-fiction materials."  Many booklists discussed on the listerv are indexed on the library website, in the following categories: Genre, Character, Setting, Subject, Author, Audience, "Best of," and Miscellaneous.  The list is a powerful resource for a worldwide community of librarians and other readers, because of its accessibility and searchable archives.  Given some basic information, almost every inquiry receives a response, often within minutes.
 Booklist Online "delivers highly searchable and creatively linked reviews, columns, and features—all designed to help users find exactly the right book."
 NoveList is a database of reading recommendations, available through libraries around the world. It is a comprehensive source of information about books, and genres that includes read-alikes, expert recommendations, recommended reads lists, professional reviews, feature articles, author bios, complete series information, and lots more. NoveList Plus includes both fiction and nonfiction titles. There is also a companion service, NoveList Select, that adds these recommendations to a library's catalog.
 BookBrowse.com offers a customized subscription service for libraries. Its readers' advisory database includes read-alikes, browsing by 100+ themes, in-depth reviews, previews, back-stories, book club advice, author bios, interviews & pronunciation guide and ezines.
 ALA Recommended Reading compiles different reading lists for all ages, especially children and teens.  Most lists are available on the ALA web site.
 LibraryReads is a monthly staff-picks list of ten newly published titles, as nominated and voted on by public library workers from around the United States. This non-profit service served as inspiration for the Loan Stars list in Canada, and the Librarians' Choice list in Australia.
 LibraryThing is a social networking website for cataloging and sharing personal and institutional library collections.  The site contains a "Suggester" feature which provides book recommendations based on user catalogs with similar books.  The broader your catalog, the more specific suggestions you will receive.
 NextReads is an email newsletter service that delivers more than 25 themed book recommendation newsletters to readers. Libraries can customize the newsletters to include only items in the library's catalog, and also add information about related events and programs happening in the library.
 Wowbrary is a weekly email newsletter showing the new books, movies, and CDs selected by a library in the previous week.  Because these items are all in the library's catalog, newsletter recipients can be among the first to place holds, even if the items have not arrived yet.
 What's Next is a free resource from the Kent District Library System in Michigan that helps users in finding quality series fiction.  "A series is two or more books linked by character(s), settings, or other common traits."
 Whichbook allows you to customize your book search by choosing characteristics of the story from a range using sliders. The sliders can be dragged from one end of one extreme to the other in order to find a desirable combination on which to base the site's recommendations. The results can be limited to a specific format such as: eBooks, audiobooks, or large print editions. While you have the option to sign into the website to save your results and create book lists, all of the search features are accessible without creating an account.
 Fantastic Fiction maintains bibliographies for over 30,000 authors and is an easy way to track series by authors and authors who write under different pseudonyms.
 BookSpot.com is a free resource "that simplifies the search for the best book-related content on the Web" and directs users to where they can find audiobooks, free first chapters, and specific lists such as award winners and the top 150 bestsellers of the week.
 Some libraries have developed online indirect readers' advisory websites based on specific titles, series, or authors.  For example, the Allen County Public Library's Lemony Snicket Read-Alikes and Supplements page answers the question of 'what to read next' with annotated book lists based around different genre and stylistic aspects of the series (mystery books, books about "Orphans or kids living without much help from adults," humorous books).  They also refer readers to non-fiction works on related topics from the Lemony Snicket series.  For example, the book Using Ropes and Knots is recommended because
"In The Bad Beginning (A Series of Unfortunate Events, Book the First)
Violet Baudelaire found herself in the unfortunate circumstance of trying to rescue her baby sister Sunny from a perilous perch. Violet was able to invent a grappling hook and attach it to a rope with the proper knot. It will be unfortunate if you do not read this book and you find yourself trying to rescue your baby sister."
 Goodreads is currently (2020) the world's largest site for readers and book recommendations. Users can keep a record of books read, are currently reading or want to read. Functionality for users includes: review and rate books, follow others; join groups; track books; and receive book recommendations, both automated and from friends. Users can tag books and can name and arrange shelves as they please. Goodreads launched in January 2007 and was acquired by Amazon.com in 2013.
 What Should I Read Next is a website that is dedicated to answer a Readers' Advisory question many patrons ask. A reader can type in either a book they like or an author they enjoy and get recommendations of similar books they should read next.  A patron can also narrow or direct their results by clicking on the subjects that calculate under a specific book they enjoy. This gives the option to search by the element that attracted a reader to a particular book to begin with.
 Literature-Map is a useful website which can offer read-alike author suggestions. Simply type an author's name into the dialogue box, press enter and a visual representation of similar authors appear. The authors which appear nearest to the name in the dialogue box are a closer representation of the style of writing sought, whereas the author names on the outer perimeter only have minor aspects of the writing style.

Blogs

Reading and/or maintaining a readers' advisory blog for a library can be beneficial for both patrons and librarians. Patrons gain access to book reviews and recommendations and librarians stay current on new releases and improve their readers’ advisory skills.
 The Book Adept is a blog written by readers' advisory professor (UCLA GSE&IS) and consultant Melissa Elliott, MLIS. It includes reviews of a variety of fiction for adults and young adults, many times with advisory-related commentary.
 The Early Word is a blog run by Nora Rawlinson and Fred Ciporen that includes loads of reading lists as well as links to news on upcoming releases and reviews. In July 2017. Earlyword ceased blogging on a regular basis other than promoting its "Galley Chats," monthly Twitter discussions about new and upcoming books for adults [#ewgc] and young adults [#ewgcya] and other occasional posts.
 Readers' Advisor Online blog from Libraries Unlimited offers essential news, tips, fun stuff, and a community for exploring RA issues.
 Readers' Advisory for All blog
 Reading Rants: Out of the Ordinary Teen Booklists is a booklist for teens written by middle school librarian Jennifer Hubert Swan and designed by Andrew Mutch where teens can also post their own book reviews.
 SLJ Blog Network A variety of blogs curated by School Library Journal.
 Lee & Low Books: The Open Book A blog on race, diversity, education, and children's books that highlights diverse titles for children.
 The Hub: Your Connection to Teen Reads Hosted by Young Adult Library Services Association, this blog provides resources for audio, video, and books related to young adult literature.
 No Flying No Tights A graphic novel review website for kids, teens, and adults.

Wikis
 Read Me
 Book Lust Community
 ALA Reader's Advisory Committee
 Readers' Advisory Services
 Readers' Advisory – Professionaltips – ALA

Chat
 The Florida Ask a Librarian Service provides live, real-time chat with librarians throughout the state, offering reference services which include readers' advisory.

See also
 Book discussion club
 Book talks promote books, including background information on the author and press reviews.
 Literary awards are often used in readers' advisory.
 Literature Circles
 Genreflecting

External links
 Readers' Advisory Link Farm
 Adult Education Resources for Librarians by Kathleen de la Peña McCook and Jillian Gilbey
 Booklist Magazine's Corner Shelf newsletter, devoted to RA topics.
 "Jack-of-All Trades Readers Advisory – How To Learn a Little About A Lot." Rebecca Vnuk and Karen Kleckner Keefe.  Public Libraries Magazine, Jan/Feb 2010.

Resources

Adults
 Genreflecting: A Guide to Popular Reading Interests. 6th ed. Herald, Diana Tixier and Wayne Wiegand. Englewood, CO: Libraries Unlimited, 2005.
 Reading Matters and Reading Still Matters. By Catherine Sheldrick Ross and others. Libraries Unlimited, 2006, 2018. .
 Readers' Advisory Services in the Public Library Joyce G. Saricks American Library Association, 3rd ed.
 "Recommended Readers' Advisory Tools.” Reference & User Services Quarterly. 43.4 (2004):294–305. 4 April 2005.
 Reader's Advisory Service in North America Public Libraries 1870–2005: A History and Critical Analysis by Juris Dilevko, Candice F.C. Magowan. McFarland, 2007.
 The Readers' Advisory Guide to Nonfiction, by Neal Wyatt. Chicago: ALA editions, 2007.
 Non-Fiction Readers' Advisory. Robert Burgin, ed. Westport, CT: Libraries Unlimited, 2004.
 The Reader's Advisor's Companion. Kenneth D. Shearer & Robert Burgin.  Westport, CT: Libraries Unlimited, 2001.

Children's and Young Adult Reading
 Best Books for Children : Preschool Through Grade 6, by Catherine Barr. 8th ed. Westport, CT: Libraries Unlimited, 2006.
 Best Books for High School Readers : Grades 9–12 / John T. Gillespie, Catherine Barr. Westport, CT: Libraries Unlimited, 2004.
 Best Books for Middle School and Junior High Readers: Grades 6–9, by John T. Gillespie and Catherine Barr. Westport, CT: Libraries Unlimited, 2004.
 Best Books for Middle School and Junior High Readers: Grades 6–9, Supplement to the First Edition by John T. Gillespie and Catherine Barr. Westport, CT: Libraries Unlimited, 2006.
 Best Books for Young Adults, Young Adult Library Services Association (YALSA).
 Beyond Picture Books: Subject Access to Best Books for Beginning Readers, by Barbara Barstow, Judith Riggle, and Leslie Molnar. 3rd ed. Westport, CT: Libraries Unlimited, 2008.
 Outstanding Books for the College Bound, Young Adult Library Services Association (YALSA). Chicago: ALA, 2011.
 Naked Reading: Uncovering What Tweens Need to Become Lifelong Readers, by Teri S. Lesesne. Portland, Me. : Stenhouse Publishers, 2006.
 "Newbery Medal and Honor Books, 1922–Present". Chicago: ALA. (Revised annually) 
 "Caldecott Medal & Honor Books, 1938–Present". Chicago: ALA. (Revised annually) 
 Serving Teens through Readers' Advisory, by Heather Booth. American Library Association, 2007.

Older Adults
(G.I. Generation, the Silent Generation, and the Baby Boomers)
 Ahlvers, A. (2006). "Older Adults and Readers' Advisory. Reference & User Services Quarterly, 45(4), 305–312.

References

Book promotion
Library science